The 2011 Judo Grand Prix Abu Dhabi was held in Abu Dhabi, United Arab Emirates from 16 to 18 October 2011.

Medal summary

Men's events

Women's events

Source Results

Medal table

References

External links
 

2011 IJF World Tour
2011 Judo Grand Prix
Judo
Grand Prix Abu Dhabi 2011
Judo
Judo